Pedro Gomes Brazilian municipality.

Pedro Gomes may also refer to:

Pedro Gomes (triathlete) (born 1983), Portuguese triathlete
Pedro Gomes (footballer) (born 1941), Portuguese footballer and manager

See also
Pedro Gomez (disambiguation)
Peter Gomes (disambiguation)